Ruth Ann Petroff (born September 17, 1965, in Philadelphia, Pennsylvania) is an American politician and a former Republican member of the Wyoming House of Representatives representing District 16 from January 11, 2011, until January 10, 2017.

Elections
In 2014, Petroff won the Republican Primary on August 19, unopposed with 521 votes. She was unopposed in the general election, which she won with 1,947 votes.
In 2012, Petroff won the August 21, 2012 Republican Primary with 460 votes (56.0%), and was unopposed for the November 6, 2012 General election, winning with 2,810 votes.
In 2010, when Democratic Representative Pete Jorgensen retired and left the District 16 seat open, Petroff won the August 17, 2010 Republican Primary with 951 votes (58.6%), and won the November 2, 2010 General election with 2,150 votes (54.2%) against Democratic nominee Len Carlman.

References

External links
Official page at the Wyoming Legislature
Campaign site
 

1965 births
Living people
Republican Party members of the Wyoming House of Representatives
People from Jackson, Wyoming
Politicians from Philadelphia
Women state legislators in Wyoming
21st-century American politicians
21st-century American women politicians